Giovanni Battista Cremonini (c. 1550 - 1610) was an Italian painter of the Renaissance period.

Biography
Born in Cento, but mostly active in Bologna. His father Matteo Cremonini was also a painter. Giambattista was active in fresco decoration of houses, he was aided by his cousin, Bartolommeo Ramenghi. One of his pupils was Odoardo Fialetti.

Among his works in Bologna are the following:
Frescoes in the Casa Lucchini
St Jerome and St Lawrence for Chapel of the Annunciation of the church of San Domenico
Above entrance to Church of San Francesco in Bologna
Decorations in Cantone of the Colegio di Spagna
Crucifix for church of the Scalzi
History of the building of the church in first chapel of the church of Santa Maria del Monte
Decorations lateral to Francesco Francia's altarpiece of St Roch in Chiesa dell Morte
Infirmary of San Michele in Bosco

References

 
 Grove Art Encyclopedia on Artnet biography on Fialetti
 

1550s births
1610 deaths
16th-century Italian painters
Italian male painters
17th-century Italian painters
People from Cento
Painters from Bologna
Italian Renaissance painters